Richard Ernest Schmidt (14.11.1865–17.10.1958) was an American architect, a member of the so-called first Chicago School and a near-contemporary of Frank Lloyd Wright and Louis Sullivan.

Life
Schmidt was born in Ebern, Bavaria and brought to America by his parents at the age of one. In 1883 he enrolled in the architecture school at MIT, but left to begin practicing before completing the program, working for such architects as Adolph Cudell and Charles Sumner Frost before eventually settling in Chicago in 1887.

Eight years later, he asked Hugh Mackie Gorden Garden to join him as chief designer, who was also an extremely skilled structural engineer. A native of Canada, Garden had moved to Chicago in the late-1880s, apprenticing with several architectural firms, including Flanders & Zimmerman, Henry Ives Cobb, and Shepley, Rutan & Coolidge, then becoming a freelance renderer, which brought him jobs with Howard Van Doren Shaw, Louis Sullivan, and Frank Lloyd Wright. Although known primarily for their commercial and industrial designs, the firm also designed more than 300 hospitals as well as many other public structures, all in a progressive style, similar to Sullivan and Wright.

Selected commissions
 Security Benefit Association Hospital, Topeka
 Theurer-Wrigley House, Chicago
Albert F. Madlener House, Chicago
Montgomery Ward Company Complex, Chicago
Humboldt Park Boathouse Pavilion, Chicago
Cook County Hospital Administration Building, Chicago
Michael Reese Hospital, Chicago
Institute of Thermal Research, Buffalo

References

External links
Chicago Commission on Landmarks page on Schmidt, Garden and Martin. Retrieved  August 25, 2008
Axel W.-O. Schmidt, Der rothe Doktor von Chicago - ein deutsch-amerikanisches Auswanderschicksal, Peter Lan, Frankfurt 2003.
-->

1865 births
1958 deaths
American architects
Chicago school architects
19th-century American architects
20th-century American architects
People from Bavaria